The 1947 Arkansas State Indians football team represented Arkansas State College—now known as Arkansas State University—as a member of the Arkansas Intercollegiate Conference (AIC) during the 1947 college football season. Led by second-year head coach Forrest England, the Indians compiled a overall record of 4–2–3.

Schedule

References

Arkansas State
Arkansas State Red Wolves football seasons
Arkansas State Indians football